The 2023 PDC Winmau Challenge Tour will consist of 24 darts tournaments on the 2023 PDC Pro Tour.

Prize money
The prize money for the Challenge Tour events will increase by 50% with a prize fund of £15,000 per event, with the winner of each event receiving £2,500.

This is how the prize money is divided:

January

Challenge Tour 1
Challenge Tour 1 was contested on Friday 20 January 2023 at the Marshall Arena in Milton Keynes. Dale Gadsby hit a nine-dart finish against Nico Plovier. The winner was Chris Landman.

Challenge Tour 2
Challenge Tour 2 was contested on Friday 20 January 2023 at the Marshall Arena in Milton Keynes. James Hurrell hit a nine-dart finish against Scott Mitchell. The winner was Christian Kist.

Challenge Tour 3
Challenge Tour 3 was contested on Saturday 21 January 2023 at the Marshall Arena in Milton Keynes. The winner was Andy Boulton.

Challenge Tour 4
Challenge Tour 4 was contested on Saturday 21 January 2023 at the Marshall Arena in Milton Keynes. The winner was Cam Crabtree.

Challenge Tour 5
Challenge Tour 5 was contested on Sunday 22 January 2023 at the Marshall Arena in Milton Keynes. The winner was Thibault Tricole.

March

Challenge Tour 6
Challenge Tour 6 was contested on Friday 17 March 2023 at Halle 39 in Hildesheim.

Challenge Tour 7
Challenge Tour 7 is to be contested on Friday 17 March 2023 at Halle 39 in Hildesheim.

Challenge Tour 8
Challenge Tour 8 is to be contested on Saturday 18 March 2023 at Halle 39 in Hildesheim.

Challenge Tour 9
Challenge Tour 9 was contested on Saturday 18 March 2023 at Halle 39 in Hildesheim.

May

Challenge Tour 10
Challenge Tour 10 is to be contested on Friday 5 May 2023 at the Marshall Arena in Milton Keynes.

Challenge Tour 11
Challenge Tour 11 is to be contested on Friday 5 May 2023 at the Marshall Arena in Milton Keynes.

Challenge Tour 12
Challenge Tour 12 is to be contested on Saturday 6 May 2023 at the Marshall Arena in Milton Keynes.

Challenge Tour 13
Challenge Tour 13 is to be contested on Saturday 6 May 2023 at the Marshall Arena in Milton Keynes.

Challenge Tour 14
Challenge Tour 14 is to be contested on Sunday 7 May 2023 at the Marshall Arena in Milton Keynes.

August

Challenge Tour 15
Challenge Tour 15 is to be contested on Friday 4 August 2023 at the Marshall Arena in Milton Keynes.

Challenge Tour 16
Challenge Tour 16 is to be contested on Friday 4 August 2023 at the Marshall Arena in Milton Keynes.

Challenge Tour 17
Challenge Tour 17 is to be contested on Saturday 5 August 2023 at the Marshall Arena in Milton Keynes.

Challenge Tour 18
Challenge Tour 18 is to be contested on Saturday 5 August 2023 at the Marshall Arena in Milton Keynes.

Challenge Tour 19
Challenge Tour 19 is to be contested on Sunday 6 August 2023 at the Marshall Arena in Milton Keynes.

October

Challenge Tour 20
Challenge Tour 20 is to be contested on Saturday 28 October 2023 at the Robin Park Tennis Centre in Wigan.

Challenge Tour 21
Challenge Tour 21 is to be contested on Saturday 28 October 2023 at the Robin Park Tennis Centre in Wigan.

Challenge Tour 22
Challenge Tour 22 is to be contested on Sunday 29 October 2023 at the Robin Park Tennis Centre in Wigan.

Challenge Tour 23
Challenge Tour 23 is to be contested on Sunday 29 October 2023 at the Robin Park Tennis Centre in Wigan.

Challenge Tour 24
Challenge Tour 24 is to be contested on Monday 30 October 2023 at the Robin Park Tennis Centre in Wigan.

References

2023 in darts
2023 PDC Pro Tour
Challenge Tour